M59 may refer to:

 Messier 59, an elliptical galaxy in the constellation Virgo
 M59 armored personnel carrier, a United States military vehicle
 M59 rifle, a Yugoslav copy of the SKS
 M-59 (Michigan highway), a Michigan state highway near Detroit
 M59 (Cape Town), a Metropolitan Route in Cape Town, South Africa
 M59 (Johannesburg), a Metropolitan Route in Johannesburg, South Africa
 M59 (Durban), a Metropolitan Route in Durban, South Africa
 Meridian 59, an online game
 M59/85, a Yugoslav modification of Stahlhelm that eventually replaced the latter
 155 mm gun M59, United States military field gun